Utrine is a name of several places. It may refer to:

 Utrine, Zagreb, a large residential neighborhood in Zagreb
 Utrine (Ada), a village in Serbia